Shorea pilosa is a tree in the family Dipterocarpaceae, native to Borneo. The specific epithet pilosa means hairy, referring to the indumentum.

Description
The brown to yellowish bark is initially smooth, later becoming flaky. The inflorescences bear pinkish cream flowers.

Distribution and habitat
Shorea pilosa is endemic to Borneo.

Conservation
Shorea pilosa has been assessed as near threatened on the IUCN Red List. It is threatened by conversion of land for intensive agriculture, including for palm oil plantations. It is also threatened by logging for its timber. Shorea pilosa does occur in a number of protected areas.

References

pilosa
Endemic flora of Borneo
Plants described in 1962